is a Japanese professional boxer who has held the IBF atomweight title since September 2022 and the WBO atomweight title from 2018 to 2022.

Professional career

Early career
Iwakawa made her professional debut on 19 December 2011, where she defeated Shoko Hayashida by knockout KO in a four-round bout at the Korakuen Hall in Tokyo. Iwakawa went on to amass a 5–4–1 record over the next five years, before being booked to face Narirat Klaphom for the vacant OPBF female light flyweight title on 20 August 2016. She captured her first professional title by a second-round technical knockout. Winning this title earned Iwakawa the right to challenge the once-defeated Yunoka Furukawa for the WBA female atomweight title on 13 December 2016, in the co-main event of DANGAN LADIES vol.3, which was held on 13 December 2016 at the Korakuen Hall in Tokyo, Japan. She lost the fight by a closely contested majority decision, with two judges scoring the bout 96–94 and 97–93 for Furukawa, while the third judge scored it an event 95–95.

Atomweight world champion

WBO atomweight champion
On 30 June 2018, it was revealed that Iwakawa would face the reigning WBO female atomweight champion Nao Ikeyama, in what was Ikeyama's seventh title defense. The title bout took place on 29 July 2018, at the KBS Hall in Kyoto, Japan. She won the fight by split decision, with two 96–94 scorecards for Iwakawa and one 96–94 scorecard for her opponent. The 48-year old Ikeyama announced her intention to retire in her post-fight interview.

Iwakawa was booked to face the journeyman Momoko Kanda in a non-title bout on 7 December 2019. Iwakawa fought the #1 ranked WBO flyweight to stay busy, as she had been out of the ring for 17 months, with her previous bout against Nao Ikeyama taking place on 29 July 2018. Iwakawa beat Kanda by unanimous decision, with all three judges awarding her a 78-74 scorecard. Iwakawa made her first WBO atomweight title defense against Nanae Suzuki on 26 September 2020, at the Central Gym in Kobe, Japan. Iwakawa maintained distance and scored points by landing one-twos, and was awarded a split decision. Two judges scored the fight 96–94 and 97–93 for her, while the third judge scored it 97–93 for Suzuki.

On 5 April 2021, Tadanori Yamashita, the chairman of her former gym Takasago Gym, was arrested and had his boxing license suspended. Following this, Iwakawa left and began training at the Himeji Kinoshita Gym. On 27 December of the same year, it was announced that Iwakawa and Nanae Suzuki would face each other in an immediate rematch, due to the close nature of their first meeting. The bout took place on 25 February 2022. Iwakawa lost the fight by split decision, with scores of 96–94, 94–96 and 94–96.

IBF atomweight champion
During a press conference held on 21 July 2022, it was announced that Iwakawa would challenge Ayaka Miyao for the IBF female atomweight title on the undercard of "Queens Crest 2022", an all female event held jointly by Shinsei Promotion, Misako Promotion and DANGAN. She won the fight by a close unanimous decision, with all three judges scoring the bout 96–94 in her favor.

Iwakawa faced Ploypailin Palatsrichuai in a stay-busy, non-title bout on 26 February 2023. She won the fight by a third-round technical knockout.

Professional boxing record

See also
 List of current female world boxing champions
 List of WBO female world champions
 List of IBF female world champions

References 

Living people
1983 births
Japanese women boxers
World Boxing Organization champions
Atomweight boxers